Edwin Wilson was the theater critic for The Wall Street Journal from 1972 to 1994. The author or co-author, with Alvin Goldfarb, of several widely used text books on theater, he taught at Hunter College and the CUNY Graduate Center for thirty years. He has been the president of the New York Drama Critics' Circle and the Theatre Development Fund, the chairman of the Pulitzer Prize Drama Jury, and a board member of the Susan Smith Blackburn Prize and the John Golden Fund. He has also written a novel, The Patron Murders.

Wilson studied at Vanderbilt University, University of Edinburgh, and Yale University, and received the first Doctor of Fine Arts degree awarded by Yale. His 90 television interviews with theater artists appeared on 200 PBS stations around the country.

Wilson's books include:

References

American theater critics
American male journalists
The Wall Street Journal people
American male novelists
Graduate Center, CUNY faculty
Hunter College faculty
Writers from Nashville, Tennessee
Historians of theatre
Vanderbilt University alumni
Alumni of the University of Edinburgh
Yale School of Drama alumni
Living people
Year of birth missing (living people)